The 3rd arrondissement of Paris (IIIe arrondissement) is one of the 20 arrondissements (districts) of the capital city of France. In spoken French, this arrondissement is colloquially referred to as the "troisième" meaning "third" in French. Its postal code is 75003. It is governed locally together with the 1st, 2nd and 4th arrondissement, with which it forms the 1st sector of Paris. 

The arrondissement, called Temple and situated on the right bank of the River Seine, is the smallest in area after the 2nd arrondissement. The arrondissement contains the northern, quieter part of the medieval district of Le Marais (while the 4th arrondissement contains Le Marais' more lively southern part, notably including the gay district of Paris).

History 
The oldest surviving private house of Paris, built in 1407, is to be found in the 3rd arrondissement, 52 rue de Montmorency.

The ancient Jewish quarter, the Pletzl (פלעצל, little place in Yiddish) which dates from the 13th century begins in the eastern part of the 3rd arrondissement and extends into the 4th. It is home to the Musée d'art et d'histoire du judaïsme and the Agoudas Hakehilos synagogue designed by the architect Guimard. Although trendy boutiques are now taking up many of the storefronts, there are still landmark stores selling traditional Jewish foods.

A small but slowly expanding Chinatown, inhabited by immigrants from Wenzhou, centers on the rue au Maire, near the Conservatoire national des arts et métiers housed in the medieval priory of Saint-Martin-des-Champs.

Geography

Size 
With a land area of 1.2 km2 (as recorded in 2017 census) (0.452 square miles, or 289 acres), the 3rd arrondissement and ranks the second smallest arrondissement in the city.

Location 
It is situated in what is considered Central Paris on the right bank of the city rive droite. Its interior is mostly absent of the large Haussmannian boulevards included in many other arrondissements throughout the city.

Neighborhoods (Quartiers) 
The arrondissement includes a range of neighborhoods or quartiers most of which date back as early as the Middle Ages. Most residents and locals refer to this area as Temple, Arts et Metiers or more generally, Le Marais; however most of the Marais district is included in the 4th arrondissement, which it neighbors on its southern border. called Temple and situated on the right bank of the River Seine, is the smallest in area after the 2nd arrondissement.

Demographics
The area now occupied by the third arrondissement attained its peak population in the period preceding the re-organization of Paris in 1860. In 1999, the population was 34,248, while the arrondissement hosted a total of 29,723 jobs.

Historical population
¹

Immigration

Education

There are six public high-schools in the 3rd arrondissement, and no private high-schools.  
 Lycée Victor Hugo, 27 rue de Sevigné
 Lycée Turgot, 69 rue de Turbigo
 Lycée Simone Veil, 7 rue de Poitou
 Lycée Professionel François Truffaut, 28 rue Debelleyeme
 Lycée professionnel de la bijouterie Nicolas Flamel (an annex of the École Boulle), 8 rue de Montmorency
 Lycée professionnel Abbé Grégoire, 70 bis, rue de Turbigo

Map

Places of interest

Museums 
There are 9 museums alone in the 3rd arrondissement as listed by the Paris office of tourism, however there are also many other smaller museums, as listed below.

Musée des Arts et Métiers

Musée de la Chasse et de la Nature

Musée Cognacq-Jay

Musée national Picasso-Paris

Musée de la Poupée

Musée de la Serrure

Musée des Archives Nationales - Hôtel de Soubise

Musée d'art et d'histoire du Judaïsme

Musée Carnavalet - Histoire de Paris

Henri Cartier-Bresson Foundation

Gaîté Lyrique

Gardens 
There are 6 smaller gardens throughout the 3rd arrondissement.

Square du Temple - Parc Elie Wiesel 
Square Saint-Gilles Grand Veneur - Pauline-Roland

Jardin de Rohan

Square Georges Cain

Square Léopold-Achille

Jardin Anne Frank

Jardin de l'Hotel Salé - Léonor Fini

Jardin des Archives Nationale

Churches

 Saint-Denys-du-Saint-Sacrement
 Saint-Nicolas-des-Champs, Paris

Le Marais (shared with the 4th arrondissement)
Conservatoire National des Arts et Métiers - main campus
Le Défenseur du Temps
Institut Tessin
Hôtel de Soubise
 Former Temple fortress
Carreau du Temple
Théâtre Déjazet

References

External links

 The official guide, partner of the Paris Tourist Office

 
1860 establishments in France